The 2013–14 Liga MX season  (known as the Liga BBVA Bancomer MX for sponsorship reasons) was the 67th professional top-flight football league season in Mexico. The season was split into two competitions: the Torneo Apertura and the Torneo Clausura; each of identical format and contested by the same eighteen teams.

Clubs
Eighteen teams competed in the season. Querétaro was relegated to the Ascenso MX after accumulating the lowest coefficient over the past three seasons. The 2012 Apertura Ascenso MX champion La Piedad would promote after defeating the Clausura 2013 winner Neza in a promotional play-off. But on May 28, 2013, Querétaro's ownership announced that it bought out Jaguares de Chiapas, relocated the team to Querétaro, dissolved the old Querétaro team and ensured that Querétaro would still have a team in the first division. It was also announced that San Luis would move to Tuxtla Gutiérrez and be rebranded Chiapas F.C., replacing the old Querétaro. La Piedad confirmed that they would relocate to Veracruz and be rebranded as Tiburones Rojos de Veracruz. These changes sparked controversy in the Mexican press as Querétaro effectively bought its place back in the first division and newly promoted La Piedad completely lost its team.

Stadia and locations

Personnel and kits

Managerial changes

Torneo Apertura
The Apertura 2013 is the first competition of the season. The regular season began on July 19, 2013 and ended on November 10, 2013. América successfully defended their title for the 11th time.

Regular season

Standings

Results

Liguilla - Apertura

 If the two teams are tied after both legs, the higher seeded team advances.
 "Away goals" rule was applied in the play-off round, but not in the final.
 Both finalists qualified to the 2014–15 CONCACAF Champions League (champion in Pot A, runner-up in Pot B).

Top goalscorers
Players ranked by goals scored, then alphabetically by last name.

Source: Televisa Deportes

Hat-tricks

* Scored four goals

Torneo Clausura
The Clausura 2014 is the second competition of the season. The regular season began on January 3, 2014 and ended on May 18, 2014. León successfully defended their sixth title.

Regular season

Standings

Results

Liguilla - Clausura

 If the two teams are tied after both legs, the higher seeded team advances.
 "Away goals" rule was applied in the play-off round, but not in the final.
 Both finalists qualified to the 2014–15 CONCACAF Champions League (champion in Pot A, runner-up in Pot B).

Top goalscorers
Players ranked by goals scored, then alphabetically by last name.

Source: MedioTiempo.com

Hat-tricks

* Scored four goals

Relegation

Last update: May 8, 2014

Average attendance

 Club América 43.370
 Tigres 40.784
 CF Monterrey 30.548
 Club Tijuana 22.715
 CF Pachuca 22.454
 León FC 21.744
 CD Guadalajara 21.147
 Santos Laguna 19.907
 Querétaro FC 19.462
 Universidad Nacional 19.218
 Chiapas FC 18.305
 Cruz Azul 18.090
 Atlas 17.855
 Veracruz 17.176
 Puebla FC 16.640
 Monarcas Morelia 14.441
 Deportivo Toluca 13.292
 Atlante FC 6.377

References

External links
 Official website of Liga MX
 Mediotiempo.com
 2013-14 Liga MX average attendances

 
Mx
1
2013-14